5 Tracks is the second extended play by Welsh musician John Cale, released in May 2003 and comprising five previously unreleased songs. It was Cale's first release for EMI. The EP was followed by the album HoboSapiens, which was released in October 2003 and does not contain any songs from this EP.

The song "Wilderness Approaching" features in the 2003 Ramin Niami film Paris.

Track listing
All songs written by John Cale.

Personnel
 John Cale − vocals, guitar, bass, keyboards, piano
 Eden Cale − background vocals on "Verses"
Technical
Andy Green - additional production (tracks 2-5)
Dimitri Tikovoï - additional production (tracks 1-3)
Rick Myers - art direction, design
Corinne Day - cover photography

References 

John Cale EPs
2003 EPs
Albums produced by John Cale
Albums produced by Dimitri Tikovoi
EMI Records EPs